Eugoa fasciata is a moth of the family Erebidae first described by Walter Rothschild in 1913. It is found in New Guinea.

References

fasciata
Moths described in 1913